KOGD-LP (107.1 FM) is a low-power FM radio station licensed to Shawnee, Oklahoma, United States. The station is currently owned by Benedictine Fathers Of Sacred Heart Mission, Inc.

History
The station call sign KOGD-LP on October 5, 2015.

References

External links
 
 http://www.okcr.org

OGD-LP
Radio stations established in 2015
2015 establishments in Oklahoma
OGD-LP
Pottawatomie County, Oklahoma
Catholic Church in Oklahoma